Dafna is a kibbutz in the Upper Galilee in northern Israel, 7 km east of Kiryat Shmona. It was founded on 3 May 1939 as a Tower and Stockade settlement, and was the first Tower and Stockade-type settlement in the northern Hula Valley. Dafna, Beit Hillel, She'ar Yashuv, and Dan were known as "the Ussishkin Fortresses" – Ussishkin Fortress Alef (1), Bet (2), Gimel (3), and Dalet (4), respectively. Three streams of the river Dan surround the kibbutz.

History

Early Roman pottery fragments have been found in an  excavation  in Dafna. A place called Daphne was mentioned in this vicinity by Josephus.

Edward Robinson, who visited in 1852, identified Daphne with a "low mound of rubbish with cut stones, evidently the remains of a former town" called Difneh that he encountered while riding south from Tel el-Qadi to Mansura. He noted that the land for some distance south was called Ard Difneh.

The Survey of Western Palestine identified Daphne with Khirbet Dufnah, meaning "the ruin of Daphne (oleander)", which they marked on their map in the place where Al-Shawka al-Tahta was to stand later, about 1 km NNW of present-day Dafna.

An Arab settlement was founded sometime between 1858 and 1878. Difnah was listed as a village by the Mandate government in 1924. At the time of the 1931 census, Dafna had 66 occupied houses and a population of 318 Muslims and one Christian. At the beginning of 1939, the village was pillaged by bedouin, causing most of the population to leave. The land was soon purchased by the Jewish National Fund. The JNF was represented in the negotiations by the same man, Kamel Hussein, who had earlier led the raid on Tel-Hai in which Josef Trumpeldor was killed.

The original Jewish settlers were immigrants mostly from Poland and Lithuania.

By  the 1944/45 statistics,  Dafna had a population of 380 Jews with a total land area of 2,663 dunams, of which Jews owned 2,189 dunams. Of this, a total of 2,385 dunams of land were irrigated or used for plantations, 5 dunums were used for cereals; while 50 dunams were classified as built-up (or Urban) area.

In 1947, it had a population of 600. During early 1947 Palmach Officer Moshe Kelman was ordered by the Haganah High Command to supervise the execution and burial of a Jew accused of collaborating with the British. The execution took place at Kibbutz Dafna.

After the 1948 Palestine war, Dafna took over part of the land belonging to the newly depopulated Palestinian village of Al-Sanbariyya.

According to a 1949 book by the Jewish National Fund, Dafna along with other border settlements of Dan and Kfar Szold held off the Syrian and Lebanese forces during the 1948 Arab-Israeli war.  However, the settlement was often bombarded and was said to have suffered heavy damage.

The fictional kibbutz Gan Dafna, its name presumably a nod to the real-life kibbutz Dafna, figures prominently in Leon Uris's book Exodus, as the hometown of the protagonist Ari Ben Caanan.

1997 Israeli helicopter disaster

On 4 February 1997, at approximately 19:00, two "Yasur" Sikorsky CH 53 helicopters carrying 73 soldiers and loaded with ammunition collided in mid-air over She'ar Yashuv. One of the helicopters smashed into an open field near the cemetery of Dafna. It is believed that this accident increased the pressure on the IDF to withdraw its forces from Lebanon, finally done in May 2000.

Today a monument next to the cemetery of Dafna commemorates the 73 fallen soldiers.  The monument consists of 73 obelisks and a running stream of water that leads, via a path of glass and stone to a huge tree whose leaves symbolize the names of those killed in the disaster.  It is visited by many Israelis throughout the year.

Education
Har Vagai (mountain and valley), one of the junior and senior regional high schools, is located in kibbutz Dafna. The school has 900-1000 pupils from 7th to 12th grade. The school covers an area of about 1 km square and the river Dan runs through the middle of the school grounds. The pupils are drawn from kibbutzim who were originally in the United Kibbutz movement (HaGoshrim, Kfar Szold and Dafna in the northern valley, Gadot, Mahanayim and Hulata in the south, Ein Zivan, Merom Golan and El Rom on the Golan and Malkia, Manara and Misgav Am on the mountains to the west) . Dan and Snir (originally Hashomer Hatzair) also joined later, as did many students from towns such as Rosh Pinna, Metula and Yesud HaMa'ala.

The school holds a memorial service and educational seminar every year to commemorate the 73 soldiers who were lost in the helicopter disaster of 4 February 1997.
The elementary school for the kibbutz children is Aley Giva (atop a hill) which is situated in Kibbutz Kfar Giladi. The children from Dafna are taken by bus there and back every day.
There is a thriving education system of kindergartens for young children from the age of 6 months up to 6 years when they start the first year of school.

Economy
Dafna Industries was founded 1964 and is today one of the leading footwear exporters of Israel. Its products are exported to Europe, North and South America. Following a downturn in the world economy the factory went through a difficult period and was eventually sold to another Israeli footwear manufacturer Teva Neot with Dafna retaining a portion of the shares.

Additional economic activities, which are part of the revenue producing activities of the kibbutz, are:
apple, avocado and grapefruit orchards, cotton growing, dairy cattle and commercial fish ponds and renting accommodation. In addition, the tourist guest house "Ganei Dafna" (Garden of Dafna) offers recreational diversion.

The kibbutz also runs a fish restaurant and camping ground where visitors can pitch their tents next to the river and enjoy a grilled trout in the restaurant nearby. Dafna cooperated with Dan in establishing the first trout-breeding enterprise in the area.

References

Bibliography

External links
Kibbutz Dafna Official Website
 

Kibbutzim
Kibbutz Movement
Populated places established in 1939
Jewish villages in Mandatory Palestine
1939 establishments in Mandatory Palestine
Populated places in Northern District (Israel)